BSC YB Frauen is a Swiss women's football team representing BSC Young Boys in the Nationalliga A. 

Founded in 1970 as women's division of FC Bern, it is the second most successful team in the championship with 11 titles between 1978 and 2011, and the most successful team in the national Cup with 15 trophies, including 8 titles in a row between 1994 and 2001. This last year saw FC Bern win the last of its 7 doubles to date and become the first Swiss team to take part in the UEFA Women's Cup. However, the 2000s proved less fruitful, and Bern wasn't able to win any titles. In 2009 the club was absorbed by Young Boys, taking its current name, and two years later it ended its decade-long unlucky streak winning its 11th Nationalliga trophy.

Honours
 11 Swiss Leagues (1978, 1979, 1984, 1986, 1992, 1995 — 1997, 2000, 2001, 2011)
 15 Swiss Cups (1978, 1980, 1982 — 1985, 1991, 1994 — 2001)

Record in UEFA competitions

Current squad

Former players

References

Women's football clubs in Switzerland
Women
Bern
Football clubs in Bern
1970 establishments in Switzerland